Drip pricing is a technique used by online retailers of goods and services whereby a headline price is advertised at the beginning of the purchase process, following which additional fees, taxes or charges, which may be unavoidable, are then incrementally disclosed or "dripped". The objective of drip pricing is to gain a consumer's interest in a misleadingly low headline price without the true final price being disclosed until the consumer has invested time and effort in the purchase process and made a decision to purchase. Naïve consumers will purchase based on headline price and sophisticated consumers will consider total cost when comparing offers. Drip pricing can distort competition because it can make it difficult for businesses with more transparent pricing practices to compete on a level playing field.

Many jurisdictions have enacted legislation to outlaw drip pricing of fees, taxes and surcharges. For example, throughout the European Economic Area and most of the rest of Europe, retailers must include VAT in prices given to consumers. Article 22 of Directive 2011/83/EU on Consumer Rights outlaws the default selection of additional drip-priced charges such as pre-ticked boxes on websites; this is enacted in the United Kingdom under Regulation 40 of the Consumer Contracts (Information, Cancellation and Additional Charges) Regulations 2013.

Effectiveness 
Tversky and Kahneman’s research (1974, as cited in Ahmetoglu, Furnham, & Fagan) suggests that the reason for drip pricing being so effective is due to consumers “anchoring” on to what matter to them, for example the base price, and consider that the main factor when purchasing a product or service. They then take less recognition of the smaller prices, such as surcharges and therefore underestimate the total price as they are still considering the base price as a good deal.

Xia and Monroes' research (2004, as cited in Ahmetoglu, Furnham, & Fagan) suggests that a small surcharge, for example 6% of the total price, would have a positive effect on the consumer's purchasing intentions as well as satisfaction as opposed to a high surcharge, for example 12%. However, this research also pointed out that even with the high surcharge of 12%, the consumer's purchasing intentions did not change, even if their satisfaction levels did. This suggests evidence that drip pricing could be an effective pricing strategy, as it lures consumers in with a low base price and adds smaller charges, which the consumer does not recognize, as they are focused on the base price. Even if drip pricing does not have positive impact on the satisfaction levels of consumers, it is clear that a company could extract higher charges from a consumer with similar, if not same, levels of purchase intentions.

By industry sector

Airlines 

Drip pricing of unavoidable additional charges on air fares is outlawed in the European Economic Area. Article 23 of Regulation (EC) No 1008/2008 requires that "The final price to be paid shall at all times be indicated and shall include the applicable air fare or air rate as well as all applicable taxes, and charges, surcharges and fees which are unavoidable and foreseeable at the time of publication". In the early 2010s, many budget airlines sought to circumvent this requirement by adding surcharges for the most common means of payment. For example, Ryanair surcharged £6 per passenger per flight segment to process a single debit card payment whose cost was only a few pence. Article 19 of Directive 2011/83/EU on Consumer Rights has limited such payment surcharges to "the cost borne by the trader" since 13 June 2014, but because of the prevalence of these surcharges, the United Kingdom enacted the legislation earlier than required with effect from 6 April 2013 under the Consumer Rights (Payment Surcharges) Regulations 2012. Later legislation under Article 62(4) of Directive (EU) 2015/2366 (Payment Services Directive) prohibits card surcharges throughout the EEA with effect from 13 January 2018, which the United Kingdom enacted under Regulation 6A(1) of the Consumer Rights (Payment Surcharges) Regulations 2012.

In mid-2014, the Australian Competition & Consumer Commission took legal action against Virgin Australia and Jetstar in respect of drip pricing.

After being faced with increasing regulation of the types of surcharges that may be drip-priced, airlines have created new types of drip-priced surcharges. For example Spirit Airlines from August 2010  and Wizz Air from October 2012  started surcharging passengers who travel with conventionally-sized hand luggage. Following Ryanair's introduction of allocated seating in February 2014, it and other UK-based airlines have been accused of seating young children far away from their parents unless a surcharge is paid. This is despite the UK's Civil Aviation Authority guidelines stating that airlines' seat allocation procedures should aim to seat children close to their parents.

An example of airlines' drip pricing is shown in Robbert and Roth’s (2014) research which states “You click on “Book Now” and enter your personal information. Just as you are about to finish the transaction, you see that the payment with your preferred credit card costs an additional US$20”.

Event ticketing 
The primary and secondary ticketing industry has faced considerable scrutiny in the United Kingdom. Many event organisers and secondary ticketing agencies, in addition to any published markup contained within the headline price, add unavoidable delivery fees for tickets later in the purchase process, even when customers print their own tickets or collect them from a box office.

Hotel & resort booking agents 
Cities in many southern European countries, such as Greece, Italy and Spain, impose a city tax on guests staying in hotels. Booking agents often exclude the city tax from the quoted headline price, leaving the hotel guest to pay the tax locally upon check-out. Article 6(1)(e) of Directive 2011/83/EU on Consumer Rights requires businesses to quote to consumers "the total price of the goods or services inclusive of taxes". In Italy, where city taxes are often omitted from published prices, this is enacted into national law under Article 49(1)(e) of Decreto Legislativo 21 febbraio 2014, n.21.

In May 2012, the United States Federal Trade Commission hosted "A Conference on the Economics of Drip Pricing," which focused on the practice of charging "hotel" or "resort" fees to consumers after they arrive to check-in at their hotel or resort. Following the conference, the FTC issued letters against 22 hotel operators warning that their online reservation sites may "violate the law by providing a deceptively low estimate of what consumers can expect to pay for their hotel rooms". According to the FTC letters, “One common complaint consumers raised involved mandatory fees hotels charge for amenities such as newspapers, use of onsite exercise or pool facilities, or internet access, sometimes referred to as ‘resort fees.’ These mandatory fees can be as high as $30 per night, a sum that could certainly affect consumer purchasing decisions”. The warning letters also stated that consumers often did not know they would be required to pay resort fees in addition to the quoted hotel rate.

In 2017, the FTC published an extensive report titled "Economic Analysis of Hotel Resort Fees," which further detailed the practice of unfair and deceptive drip pricing practices in the hotel and resort industries. The report found that "separating mandatory resort fees from posted room rates without first disclosing the total price is likely to harm consumers by artificially increasing the search costs and the cognitive costs of finding and booking hotel accommodations."

Airbnb 
When Airbnb customers search for accommodation, Airbnb displays per-night prices that exclude its own per-night service charges, and the total price is not revealed until the customer selects an individual property. Furthermore, if the customer searches for properties within a price range, the search returns properties where only part of the price falls within the desired price range rather than where the total price falls within the price range. In late 2015, the Australian Competition and Consumer Commission took action against Airbnb for this form of drip pricing. Consequently users of Airbnb's Australian web site now see the total price of a stay including all unavoidable charges at every stage of the booking process. In July 2018, the European Commission threatened action against Airbnb in view of its website breaching EU law by headline prices failing to include fees and charges later passed on to the consumer, including cleaning costs.

Ethics 
“We find that that consumers perceive drip prices as unfair.” (Robbert & Roth, 2014) This is the issue when it comes to price drip strategy. Is it fair to show a lower price and slowly add additional costs towards the end of a transaction? Robbert and Roth’s research (2014) goes on to show that consumers disapprove of the way that the prices are being presented. This can have a negative impact on the purchase itself as if consumers feel they are being treated unfairly due to drip pricing strategy, they may consider substitute goods and services.

Economic Effects 
Even under the circumstances of fully rational consumers and suppliers, consumers are harmed for industry benefit. The main discredit of this strategy isn't firms using this tactic in order to gain an advantage over other firms, but rather it increases the "consumer's cost to searching elsewhere".

Search friction inhibits consumers from obtaining sufficient market information to make an informed decision, an effect which is amplified by drip pricing. When drip pricing is employed, a competitive market is insufficient to mitigate the additional search friction consumers experience. Drip pricing is a method used to isolate and restrict competitive forces to the base price only, with minimal competition influence on additional charges.

See also
Foot-in-the-door technique

References

Further reading

External links
 Drip pricing at Investopedia
 

Pricing
Competition (economics)